Benfey is a surname. Notable people with the surname include:

Christopher Benfey (born 1954), American literary critic
Otto Theodor Benfey (born 1925), chemist and historian of science
Theodor Benfey (1809–1881), German philologist and scholar of Sanskrit
Theodore Benfey (1871–1935), American politician